Alex Mieza, Taoist name Zi Xiao (Chinese: 资晓, Pinyin: Zī Xiǎo, born January 3, 1980, in Barcelona, Spain) is an international master of traditional Chinese martial arts, Qigong and Internal Alchemy. Mieza represents Sanfeng Pai school of Wudang Taoism, China.

In 2012, Mieza was initiated into the traditional Daoist family of Wudang mountains by the Daoist ritual of Bai Shi (Discipleship Ceremony) becoming an official member of Wudang Sanfeng Pai's Taoist school official lineage, representing the 16th Generation of lineage holders, which dates back to the 14th century when it was created by the historic Daoist monk Zhang Sanfeng (张三丰 Zhāng Sānfēng).

Mieza is the first official Spanish disciple under Taoist master Yuan Xiugang, he represents his master Yuan Xiugang and shares Chinese martial art and Taoism knowledge to the western world.

In 2015, Mieza became the world Kung Fu champion after winning the first place in the World Traditional Chinese Kuoshu Championship in Taiwan.

See also 

 Wudang Mountains
 Taoist schools
 Neidan
 Qigong
 Chinese martial arts
Wudang quan
Zhang Sanfeng
Neigong

References

External links 
Alex Mieza's Official Website

Wudang Sanfeng Pai Taoist School's Disciples

1980 births
Living people